Luka Snoj (born March 16, 1990) is a Slovenian advanced data analyst, lawyer, 3x3 basketball pioneer, and the author of the first-ever international book on 3x3 basketball.

Career 

Snoj is the first European player to have played in the first professional 3x3 basketball league in the world. He started playing 3x3 basketball professionally in 2010 and has played in more than 500 games over his career. He was continuously ranked among the 50 best 3x3 basketball players in the world in the FIBA 3x3 Individual World Rankings. His highest career ranking was no. 27 in 2015.

Post-retirement

After his retirement as a professional 3x3 basketball player in 2020, he started coaching and later educating players, coaches, and others internationally about 3x3 as the game was still unknown to many at that time. As such his literary and professional work helped grow the game of 3x3 basketball even before 3x3 earned worldwide recognition and debuted at the 2020 Tokyo Olympics. Luka's findings of how 3x3 basketball players and teams in-game data statistically differ from 5 on 5 basketballs were groundbreaking and important for further researches and analysis between the two basketball disciplines. He is also known for his advanced data analysis, unique 3x3 basketball theory, and other published work in the field of 3x3 basketball.

As a 3x3 basketball coach Snoj guided team 3x3 Ljubljana Center (Slovenia) to its first Slovenian 3x3 basketball national championship title in 2022.

Notable work

His book 3x3 Basketball: Everything you need to know is the first-ever book to cover multiple aspects of 3x3 basketball. In it, he comprehensively presents the differences between traditional and 3x3 basketball and outlines the fundamental tactics and game structure, theory, terminology, as well as principles for successful play. He also details the history of 3x3 basketball - why and how it was formed as well as how the sport has evolved over the years. He also describes the competition system, including how the rules have changed, and what teams have been successful over the past decade. Snoj also weaves contemporary interviews with top players like Dušan Bulut - 3x3 basketball's GOAT (four-time world champion) - to round out the narrative on a sport whose popularity will only continue to grow. Finally, Snoj provides both statistical and analytical analyses of the sport. The historical and statistical data used in the book has been obtained from FIBA 3x3 and has not been known to the public before. After obtaining the in-game statistical data Snoj made a statistical analysis of the best 3x3 basketball teams in the world, clarified why 3x3 teams win or lose, presented the in-game 3x3 basketball players habits and characteristics, and finally compared the efficiency of 3x3 teams with NBA teams to present how the two disciplines differ.

References

http://www.fiba.basketball/news/snoj-eyes-professional-3x3-experience-in-japan
https://www.fiba.basketball/news/snoj-writes-first-ever-book-on-3x3
https://www.skysports.com/olympics/news/36226/12364784/everything-you-need-to-know-about-3x3-basketball-at-the-tokyo-olympics
https://play.fiba3x3.com

Living people
Slovenian men's basketball players
Slovenian 3x3 basketball players
3x3 basketball
1990 births
Sportspeople from Ljubljana
Lawyers from Ljubljana
21st-century Slovenian lawyers